A cliché ( or ) is an element of an artistic work, saying, or idea that has become overused to the point of losing its original meaning or effect, even to the point of being weird or irritating, especially when at some earlier time it was considered meaningful or novel. In phraseology, the term has taken on a more technical meaning, referring to an expression imposed by conventionalized linguistic usage.

The term is often used in modern culture for an action or idea that is expected or predictable, based on a prior event. Typically pejorative, "clichés" may or may not be true. Some are stereotypes, but some are simply truisms and facts. Clichés often are employed for comedic effect, typically in fiction.

Most phrases now considered clichéd originally were regarded as striking but have lost their force through overuse. The French poet Gérard de Nerval once said, "The first man who compared woman to a rose was a poet, the second, an imbecile."

A cliché is often a vivid depiction of an abstraction that relies upon analogy or exaggeration for effect, often drawn from everyday experience. Used sparingly, it may succeed, but the use of a cliché in writing, speech, or argument is generally considered a mark of inexperience or a lack of originality.

Etymology 
The word cliché is borrowed from French, where it is a past passive participle of clicher, 'to click', used as a noun; cliché is attested from 1825 and originated in the printing trades. The term cliché was adopted as printers' jargon to refer to a stereotype, electrotype, cast plate or block print that could reproduce type or images repeatedly. It has been suggested that the word originated from the clicking sound in "dabbed" printing (a particular form of stereotyping in which the block was impressed into a bath of molten type-metal to form a matrix). Through this onomatopoeia, cliché came to mean a ready-made, oft-repeated phrase.

Usage 

Various dictionaries recognize a derived adjective clichéd, with the same meaning. Cliché is sometimes used as an adjective, although some dictionaries do not recognize it as such, listing the word only as a noun and clichéd as the adjective.

Thought-terminating cliché

Thought-terminating clichés, also known as thought-stoppers, or semantic stopsigns, are words or phrases that discourage critical thought and meaningful discussion about a given topic. They are typically short, generic truisms that offer seemingly simple answers to complex questions or that distract attention away from other lines of thought. They are often sayings that have been embedded in a culture's folk wisdom and are tempting to say because they sound true or good or like the right thing to say. Some examples are: "Stop thinking so much", "here we go again", and "so what, what effect do my [individual] actions have?"

The term was popularized by psychiatrist Robert Jay Lifton in his 1961 book, Thought Reform and the Psychology of Totalism: A Study of "Brainwashing" in China. Lifton wrote, "The language of the totalist environment is characterized by the thought-terminating cliché. The most far-reaching and complex of human problems are compressed into brief, highly reductive, definitive-sounding phrases, easily memorized and easily expressed. These become the start and finish of any ideological analysis". Sometimes they are used in a deliberate attempt to shut down debate, manipulate others to think a certain way, or dismiss dissent. However, some people repeat them, even to themselves, out of habit or conditioning, or as a defense mechanism to reaffirm a confirmation bias.

See also

 Archetype
 Bromide (language)
 Catch-phrase
 Figure of speech
 Idiom
 I'm entitled to my opinion
 Irreversible binomial
 Kitsch
 List of English idioms on Wiktionary
 Meme
 Shitposting
 Platitude
 Pun
 Slogan
 Snowclone
 Speech
 Stock character
 Thoughts and prayers
 :Category:Tropes

References

Further reading

 
 
 
 
 

1820s neologisms
Descriptive technique
Paremiology
Jargon